Caryl Mack Parker (born in Abilene, Texas) is an American country music singer. Between 1996 and 1997, Parker charted two singles on the Billboard Hot Country Singles & Tracks chart.

Alanna Nash of Entertainment Weekly, wrote that Parker "this West Texas native conjures inventive images and dispenses sage advice." 

As a staff-writer for Warner/Chappell Music, Hamstein and Scream Music, her songs were recorded by artists such as Patty Loveless and for television shows such as The West Wing. Caryl has worked as a session vocalist, songwriter and accompanist with such artists as Vince Gill, Trisha Yearwood, Amy Grant, James Otto, Kevin Welch, Jimmy Hall, Ashley Cleveland, Kim Hill, Jude Cole and Will Hoge. She's also appeared at numerous songwriter festivals and venues in Nashville, including the Ryman Auditorium and Bluebird Cafe.

Caryl is married to producer/publisher/songwriter, Scott Parker. The couple currently lives in Nashville, Tennessee.

Discography

Albums

Singles

Music videos

References

American women country singers
American country singer-songwriters
Living people
Country musicians from Texas
People from Abilene, Texas
Singer-songwriters from Texas
Year of birth missing (living people)
21st-century American women